"I Was Blown Away" is a song written by Layng Martine Jr., and recorded by American country music artist Pam Tillis.  It was released in March 1995 as the fourth single from the album Sweetheart's Dance.  The song reached #16 on the Billboard Hot Country Singles & Tracks chart.

Content
Tillis withdrew the song after receiving letters from families of victims of the 1995 Oklahoma City bombing.

Critical reception
An uncredited review in Billboard said that "She sings her heart out, but not even she can hold up this cliché-ridden song."

Chart performance

References

1995 singles
1994 songs
Pam Tillis songs
Songs written by Layng Martine Jr.
Arista Nashville singles